Gawthorpe, also known as Gawthorp, is a hamlet in the Kirklees district, in the English county of West Yorkshire, about  east of Huddersfield. In the 19th century Gawthorpe was listed variously as a village or a hamlet in Lepton township, part of the parish of Kirkheaton in the West Riding of Yorkshire. Coal was mined at Gawthorpe around the middle of the 19th century.

It was claimed that Chief Justice Gascoigne was born here, however, he was a native of the abandoned village of Gawthorp near Harewood House.

Nearby settlements 
Nearby settlements include the town of Huddersfield, the villages of Kirkheaton and Lepton and the hamlet of Gawthorpe Green where a dyeworks and a scribbling mill were located.

References 

Hamlets in West Yorkshire
Kirkburton